Cruser Brook, also known as Crusers Brook, is a tributary of Pike Run in Somerset County, New Jersey in the United States.

Course
It flows northeast and picks up Roaring Brook. It crosses CR-601 (Belle Mead-Blawenburg Road) and continues flowing east.

Tributaries
Roaring Brook

Sister Tributaries
Back Brook
Pine Tree Run

See also
List of rivers of New Jersey

References

External links
USGS Coordinates in Google Maps

Rivers of New Jersey
Tributaries of the Raritan River
Rivers of Somerset County, New Jersey